William Craddock was an American baseball right fielder in the Negro leagues. He played with the Baltimore Black Sox and Bacharach Giants in 1929.

References

External links
 and Seamheads

Baltimore Black Sox players
Bacharach Giants players
Year of birth missing
Year of death missing
Baseball outfielders